Metfendrazine (HM-11, MO-482), also known as methphendrazine, is an irreversible and nonselective monoamine oxidase inhibitor (MAOI) of the hydrazine chemical class. It was investigated as an antidepressant, but was never marketed.

See also 
 Hydrazine (antidepressant)

References 

Hydrazines
Monoamine oxidase inhibitors